The Estonian Film and Television Awards (EFTA) are the national film industry awards that honor achievements in cinema and television. They were launched in 2017 and are organised by the Estonian Film Institute, the Ministry of Culture of the Republic of Estonia, the Cultural Endowment of Estonia and Eesti Media.

Two 21-person juries select nominees in 24 categories (12 for film, 12 for television respectively) whereas in a second voting round the winners are determined by both juries.

The first edition was held on 12 March 2017 and saw The Days that Confused winning the award for Best Picture. The second edition was held on 2 April 2018 with the film November dominating the film categories by winning Best Picture, director, Actress and five other awards. On September 2 2020 Truth and Justice was the first film that won in all the five major film categories picture, director, actor, actress and screenplay.

Categories

Film
 Best Film
 Best Documentary
 Best Animated Film
 Best Short Film
 Best Director
 Best Actor
 Best Actress
 Best Screenplay
 Best Cinematography
 Best Score
 Best Production Design
 Best Editing
 Best Costume Design
 Best Achievement in Film Making Art

Television
 Best factual programme
 Best TV Series
 Best entertainment programme
 Best new programme
 Best special programme
 Best news coverage
 Best Actor in a TV Series
 Best Actress in a TV series
 Best Programme Host
 Best Programme Hostess
 Best Television Director
 Best Screenplay for a TV series
 Best Television content editor
 Best Television Cinematography

Winners

2017
 Best Film: The Days that Confused
 Best Director: Triin Ruumet (The Days that Confused)
 Best Actor: Hendrik Toompere Jr. Jr. (The Days That Confused)
 Best Actress: Tiina Mälberg (Mother)
 Best TV Series: ESSR / ENSV
 Best TV Actor: Argo Aadli for ESSR / ENSV
 Best TV Actress: Helene Vannari for ESSR / ENSV

2018
 Best Film: November
 Best Director: Rainer Sarnet (November)
 Best Actor: Tõnu Kark (Green Cats)
 Best Actress: Rea Lest (November)
 Best TV Series: Siberi Võmm
 Best TV Actor: Mait Malmsten for ESSR / ENSV
 Best TV Actress: Luule Komissarov for Õnne 13

2019
 Best Film: The Little Comrade
 Best Director: Moonika Siimets (The Little Comrade)
 Best Actor: Reimo Sagor (Take It or Leave It)
 Best Actress: Ingrid Isotamm (Fire Lily)
 Best TV Series: Litsid
 Best TV Actor: Priit Võigemast for Alo
 Best TV Actress: Laine Mägi for ESSR / ENSV

2020
 Best Film: Truth and Justice
 Best Director: Tanel Toom (Truth and Justice)
 Best Actor: Priit Loog (Truth and Justice)
 Best Actress: Ester Kuntu (Truth and Justice)
 Best TV Series: Lahutus Eesti moodi
 Best TV Actor/Actress: Tambet Tuisk for Reetur

References

Cinema of Estonia
Awards established in 2017